Mary-Jérôme Vaudan (born 1965) from Bagnes-Montagnier is a Swiss ski mountaineer, long-distance runner and marathon mountain biker.

Selected results

Ski mountaineering 
 2004:
 1st, Patrouille de la Maya A-course, together with Chantal Daucourt and Véronique Ançay
 2005:
 1st (juniors), Trophée des Gastlosen, together with Chantal Daucourt
 2008:
 1st, Patrouille de la Maya A-course, together with Anne Bochatay and Véronique Ançay
 2011:
 10th, Trofeo Mezzalama, together with Valérie Berthod-Pellissier and Véronique Ançay

Patrouille des Glaciers 

 2004: 3rd, together with Véronique Ançay and Chantal Daucourt
 2008: 5th, together with Anne Bochatay and Véronique Ançay
 2010: 6th, together with Véronique Ançay-Carron and Valérie Berthod-Pellissier

Running 
 2010: 3rd, Trail Verbier-St Bernard - "La Traversée", 61 km
 2011: 1st, Trail Verbier-St Bernard - "La Traversée", 61 km

Mountain biking 
 2003: 3rd, Grand Raid Cristalp, 131 km
 2007: 3rd (women 1), Grand Raid Cristalp, 121 km (Verbier - Grimentz)

External links 
 Mary-Jérôme Vaudan, skimountaineering.org

References 

1965 births
Living people
Swiss female ski mountaineers
Swiss female long-distance runners
Marathon mountain bikers
Swiss ultramarathon runners
Female ultramarathon runners